The FFC Desna Chernihiv Player of the Year award is voted for annually by the members of the official fan club for FC Desna Chernihiv,  in recognition of the best overall performance by an individual player throughout the football season. Towards the end of each season, members are invited to cast their votes for this award. The winner is the player who polls the most votes. The recipient is awarded a diploma, presented on the pitch before one of the last home games of the season.

Winners

Wins by playing position

Wins by nationality

References

External links
website

Player of the Year
Association football player non-biographical articles